Khuzi Rural District is a rural district (dehestan) in Varavi District, Mohr County, Fars Province, Iran. At the 2006 census, its population was 4,092, in 859 families.  The rural district has 9 villages.

References 

Rural Districts of Fars Province
Mohr County